Subaskaran Allirajah (born 2 March 1972) is a British-Sri Lankan Tamil entrepreneur. He is the founder and chairman of Lycamobile, a telecommunications company. He is also a producer of Tamil films through his entertainment subsidiary Lyca Productions, based in Chennai, India, and began with its first film Kaththi (2014). It produced the science fiction thriller 2.0 (2018), which is India's most expensive film and the 5th most expensive non-English-language film at the time of its release. He now produces Ponniyin Selvan: I which is the second most expensive Indian film after his another film 2.0 itself.

In September 2021, he was announced as the new owner of the Jaffna Kings for the 2021 Lanka Premier League.Lyca Kovai Kings is a cricket team representing Coimbatore city of Tamil Nadu in the tournament of Tamil Nadu Premier League (TNPL). The team is owned by Lyca Productions.

Awards
In October 2011 Lycatel was ranked 36th out of 250 leading mid-market private companies in The Sunday Times. Allirajah received a gold award for Best Overall Enterprise in 2010 at the Asian Achievers Award ceremony for the impact he has made on the Asian community in the UK. The Asian Voice Political and Public Life awarded Allirajah in 2011 its "International Entrepreneur of the Year" award.

In 2012 the English Asian Business Awards presented Allirajah with the "2011 Power Business of the Year" award, recognizing the growth of the Lycamobile business globally. as well as the "Social Entrepreneur of the Year" award.

Since November 2018, Lycatel and its founder have been embroiled in a number of disputes relating to alleged fraud. The company was due for a tribunal hearing in March 2020 to argue against the HM Revenue and Customs. The firm estimates that it would have to pay £60m if it loses – a potential liability that has almost doubled in recent years. Lycamobile declined to say how much is at stake in two other disputes.

References

1972 births
Living people
English people of Sri Lankan Tamil descent
Sri Lankan Tamil businesspeople
Lyca Productions